Delwyn N Clark is a New Zealand strategic management academic. She is a life member and past president of the Australian and New Zealand Academy of Management.

Academic career
After an undergraduate at the University of Auckland, Clark moved to the University of Waikato for a PhD thesis entitled  'The role of MS/OR in strategic management : a NZ/UK comparative evaluation'  on management systems and operations research.

Selected works 
 Barney, Jay B., and Delwyn N. Clark. Resource-based theory: Creating and sustaining competitive advantage. Oxford University Press on Demand, 2007.
 Clark, Delwyn N., and Jenny L. Gibb. "Virtual team learning: An introductory study team exercise." Journal of Management Education 30, no. 6 (2006): 765–787.

References

External links
 
 institutional homepage

Living people
New Zealand women academics
University of Auckland alumni
University of Waikato alumni
Academic staff of the University of Waikato
Year of birth missing (living people)